Kik is a small village in the Lovinac municipality, in Lika–Senj County, Croatia.

Population/Demographics
According to national census of 2011, population of the settlement is 4. The majority of the population are Serbs.

References

External links
  

Populated places in Lika-Senj County